Ye Lwin (born 15 May 1951) is the former mayor of Myanmar's second largest city, Mandalay. He was concurrently appointed as Mandalay's mayor and chairman of the Mandalay City Development Committee on 5 April 2016. Ye Lwin was previously an honorary professor at University of Medicine, Mandalay.

In May 2016, he courted public controversy surrounding the upgrade of a road in Mandalay where he has a private clinic.

See also 
 Mandalay Region Government

References 

1951 births
Burmese physicians
Living people
Mayors of Mandalay
University of Medicine, Mandalay alumni